Dana Vávrová (9 August 1967 – 5 February 2009) was a Czech-German film actress and director. She was one of the most popular German actresses throughout 1980s and early 1990s. After her role in Herbstmilch as Anna Wimschneider in 1989, she became a household name in Cinema of Germany.

Biography
Vávrová was born in Prague, Czechoslovakia and played her first main film role in Ať žijí duchové! (English: Long Live the Ghosts!) in 1976, having played a minor role in Jak se točí Rozmarýny. In 1979 she played a minor role in the television mini-series Arabela. In 1982, she played the main role as Janina David in the German television mini-series Ein Stück Himmel, and was awarded the Goldene Kamera, the Goldener Gong, and an Adolf Grimme Award. In this mini-series, Joseph Vilsmaier was one of the cinematographers. In parallel with her acting, she attended the Prague Conservatory from 1981 to 1985. After some further roles including the films Amadeus and Pan Tau, she played the main role of Anna Wimschneider in Herbstmilch (English: Autumn Milk) under the directorship of Joseph Vilsmaier, whom she had married in 1986. Together with Werner Stocker, she won the Bayerischer Filmpreis and the Deutscher Filmpreis for this role.

In addition to acting, she also directed films, the last one being to complete the Artur Brauner production The Last Train, after Joseph Vilsmaier, who had been directing, was involved in an accident.

Vávrová was awarded a Bundesverdienstkreuz.

The three daughters of Vávrová and Vilsmaier, Janina Vilsmaier, Theresa Vilsmaier and Josefina Vilsmaier, are also active as actresses. Vávrová's older sister, is a television presenter in the Czech Republic.

Dana Vávrová died of cervical cancer in Munich, Germany on 5 February 2009. She was 41 years old.

Filmography

Actress

1977: Long Live Ghosts! (Director: Oldřich Lipský) - Leontýnka Brtník z Brtníku
1977: Jak se točí Rozmarýny (Director: Věra Plivová-Simková) - Zuzana
1979: Vražedné pochybnosti (Director: Ivo Toman) - Jana
1979: Kulový blesk (Director: Zdeněk Podskalský, Ladislav Smoljak)
1980: Koncert na konci léta (Director: František Vláčil)
1980: Brontosaurus (Director: Věra Plivová-Simková)
1980: Arabela (Director: Václav Vorlíček) - Little Red Riding Hood
1980: Svítalo celou noc
1982: Ein Stück Himmel (TV Mini Series, Director: Franz Peter Wirth)
1983: Kluk za dvě pětky (Director: Jaromír Borek) - Eliska
1984: Levé křídlo (Director: Jiří Hanibal) - Zdena
1984: Amadeus (Director: Miloš Forman)
1984: Bambinot (TV Mini Series, Director: Jaroslav Dudek)
1984: My všichni školou povinní (TV Mini Series, Director: Ludvík Ráža)
1988: Derrick (TV Series) - Bettina Rudolf
1988: Pan Tau (Director: Jindřich Polák) - Alena
1989: Herbstmilch (Director: Joseph Vilsmaier) - Anna Wimschneider
1991:  (Director: Joseph Vilsmaier)
1992: Der Nachbar (Director: Götz Spielmann) - Michaela
1993: Stalingrad (Director: Joseph Vilsmaier) - Irina
1993:  (Director: Radu Gabrea) - Lissy
1995: Pizza Arrabiata (Director: Jochen Richter) - Laura
1995: Schlafes Bruder (Director: Joseph Vilsmaier) - Elsbeth
1997: Comedian Harmonists (Director: Joseph Vilsmaier) - Ursula Bootz
2000: The Conception of My Younger Brother - Marie
2000: Der Bär ist los (Director: Dana Vávrová) - Briefträgerin
2002: The Damned - Michaela Holubová
2002: August der Glückliche (TV Movie, Director: Joseph Vilsmaier)
2003: Raus ins Leben - Tatjana Berkhoff
2004: Der Vater meines Sohnes (TV Movie, Director: Dagmar Damek) - Stella Fröhlich
2004:  (Director: Joseph Vilsmaier) - Susanne
2004:  (Director: Stefan Betz) - Helena
2006: Ein Hauptgewinn für Papa (TV Movie, Director: Bodo Fürneisen) - Anja Lohse
2007: Lamento (Director: René Sydow, Daniel Hedfeld) - Christiane Reitz
2008:  (TV Movie, Director: Joseph Vilsmaier) - Lilli Simoneit (final film role)

Director
1995: Wia die Zeit vergeht (documentary film about the musician Hubert von Goisern) – Regie: Dana Vávrová
1996: Hunger – Sehnsucht nach Liebe – Regie: Dana Vávrová
2006: Der letzte Zug – Regie: Dana Vávrová, Joseph Vilsmaier

References

External links
 
 
 Profile on cinema.de

1967 births
2009 deaths
Actresses from Prague
Czech child actresses
Czech film actresses
Czech women film directors
Czech emigrants to Germany
German people of Czech descent
German film actresses
German film directors
German child actresses
German women film directors
20th-century German actresses
21st-century German actresses
20th-century Czech actresses
21st-century Czech actresses
Best Actress German Film Award winners
Recipients of the Cross of the Order of Merit of the Federal Republic of Germany
Film directors from Prague
Deaths from cancer in Germany
Deaths from cervical cancer